Evelyn Byrd Harrison (June 5, 1920 – November 3, 2012) was an American classical scholar and archaeologist. She was Edith Kitzmiller Professor of the History of Fine Arts at the Institute of Fine Arts of New York University and was for more than 60 years associated with the American School of Classical Studies at Athens. Harrison specialized in 5th century B.C. Athenian Sculpture.

Biography
Born in Charlottesville, Virginia, Harrison was a member of both the Byrd and Harrison families of Virginia. She attended John Marshall High School in Richmond, Virginia. In 1941 she graduated from Barnard College with an A.B. and received her M.A. in 1943 from Columbia University. Further studies were postponed by World War II. Harrison worked for the War Department deciphering Japanese codes.

In 1949, she began her affiliation with the American School of Classical Studies at Athens, a relationship that lasted until her death. She joined the faculty of the University of Cincinnati in 1951 and received her Ph.D from Columbia in 1952. Harrison joined the faculty of Columbia in 1955 and remained there until moving to Princeton University in 1970. At Princeton she became the first female full professor in the Department of Art History and Archaeology. She became Edith Kitzmiller Professor of the History of Fine Arts at New York University in 1974 where she remained until retirement in 2006. Harrison died in New York City on November 3, 2012.

Awards and honors
 Guggenheim Fellow (1954)
 Fellow of the American Academy of Arts and Sciences (1973)
 Member of the American Philosophical Society (1979)
 Gold Medal Award for Distinguished Archaeological Achievement (1992)

Selected bibliography
 Ancient portraits from the Athenian Agora, 1960
 Archaic and archaistic sculpture, 1965
 The Athenian Agora : results of excavations conducted by the American school of classical studies at Athens, 1965
 Portrait sculpture, 1961
 The Constantinian portrait, 1967

References

1920 births
2012 deaths
American classical scholars
Women classical scholars
American School of Classical Studies at Athens
Columbia University alumni
Barnard College alumni
Classical scholars of Columbia University
Classical scholars of New York University
Classical scholars of Princeton University
Fellows of the American Academy of Arts and Sciences
Members of the American Philosophical Society
People from Charlottesville, Virginia
Columbia University faculty
University of Cincinnati faculty
American women archaeologists
New York University faculty
Byrd family of Virginia
Harrison family of Virginia